Pass It On is a 2008 album by the Dave Holland Sextet.  Long-standing Holland trombonist Robin Eubanks returns, joined by alto saxophonist Antonio Hart and trumpeter Alex Sipiagin from the Holland Big Band. Rounding out the group are the all-star rhythm section of pianist Mulgrew Miller and drummer Eric Harland. The resulting performance plays less like a sextet, and more like a very small big band.

Critical reception
An Allmusic review by Michael G. Nastros awarded the album 4 stars, stating, "Using a sextet, upright bassist Holland sets the bar even higher, adding the always tasteful pianist Mulgrew Miller and a four-horn front line that is relentless. This group continues to define jazz perfectly in the 21st century.".

Josef Woodard of JazzTimes wrote "Given the power and familiarity of Dave Holland’s longstanding sextet and the quintet before that, going back to the early ’80s, one point of surprise with his new band and recording is a fundamental change: the presence of piano. Mulgrew Miller does the keyboard honors, and along with the three-horn frontline, he makes the band sound, on first impression at least, like Holland’s most “traditional” band in decades... One of the more exciting aspects of this project, in fact, is the sense of continuity in hearing Holland dipping into his past songbook and applying new textural/ensemble garb. To hear, for example, Holland’s wakeup-call neo-hard-bop tune “Double Vision”-originally from the great 1984 chordless quintet album Seeds of Time-in this new, horns-and-piano thickened format, is to recognize the sweep and significance of the man’s work and musical thinking over the decades. In Holland’s case, the seeds of time keep reaping."

Track listing
 "The Sum of All Parts" (Robin Eubanks) - 8:11
 "Fast Track" (Dave Holland) - 6:30JAV
 "Lazy Snake" (Holland) - 10:07
 "Double Vision" (Holland) - 8:07
 "Equality" (Holland) - 9:09
 "Modern Times" (Holland) - 5:58
 "Rivers Run" (Holland) - 13:45
 "Processional" (Holland) - 4:33
 "Pass It On" (Holland) - 7:56

Personnel
Antonio Hart – alto saxophone, flute
Alex Sipiagin – trumpet
Robin Eubanks – trombone
Mulgrew Miller – piano
Dave Holland – double bass
Eric Harland – drums

References

External links

Dave Holland albums
2008 albums